Henri Frans "Hans" Dijkstal (28 February 1943 – 9 May 2010) was a Dutch politician of the People's Party for Freedom and Democracy (VVD) and financial adviser.

Early life, education, military service and early career
Dijkstal was born in Port Said, Egypt, where his father and grandfather worked in shipping. He was able to speak fluent Arabic before moving to the Netherlands at age five. Dijkstal applied at the University of Amsterdam in March 1961 majoring in Law and obtaining an Bachelor of Laws degree in June 1964. Dijkstal was conscripted in the Royal Netherlands Air Force serving as a Lieutenant and was stationed at the Air Operations Control Station Nieuw-Milligen as an air traffic controller from April 1965 until May 1967. Dijkstal worked as a financial adviser, management consultant and civics teacher in Wassenaar from August 1967 until November 1982. Dijkstal served on the Municipal Council of Wassenaar from May 1974 until April 1986 and served as an alderman in Wassenaar from March 1978 until July 1983.

National politics
Dijkstal became a Member of the House of Representatives after Wim van Eekelen was appointed as State Secretary for Foreign Affairs in the Cabinet Lubbers I after the election of 1982, serving from 11 November 1982 until 3 June 1986. Dijkstal returned as a Member of the House of Representatives after Ed Nijpels was appointed as Minister of Housing, Spatial Planning and the Environment in the Cabinet Lubbers II after the election of 1986, taking office on 30 July 1986 serving as a frontbencher chairing the parliamentary committee for Petitions and the Citizen Initiatives and spokesperson for Minorities and Welfare. After the election of 1994 Dijkstal was appointed as Deputy Prime Minister and Minister of the Interior in the Cabinet Kok I, taking office on 22 August 1994. After the election of 1998 Dijkstal returned as a Member of the House of Representatives, taking office on 19 May 1998. 

Following the cabinet formation of 1998 Dijkstal per his own request asked not to be considered for a cabinet post in the new cabinet, he was seen by the People's Party for Freedom and Democracy leadership as the favorite son to succeed Frits Bolkenstein as the next Leader of the People's Party for Freedom and Democracy. In July 1998 the Leader of the People's Party for Freedom and Democracy and Parliamentary leader of the Party for Freedom and Democracy in the House of Representatives Bolkenstein announced he was stepping down as Leader and Parliamentary leader in the House of Representatives, the People's Party for Freedom and Democracy leadership approached Dijkstal as his successor, Dijkstal accepted and became the Leader of the People's Party for Freedom and Democracy and Parliamentary leader, taking office on 30 July 1998. 

For the election of 2002 Dijkstal served as Lijsttrekker (top candidate). Dijkstal and Labour Leader Ad Melkert were the front runners to become the next Prime Minister, but the unexpected arrival of Pim Fortuyn of Livable Netherlands (LN) and later the Pim Fortuyn List (LPF), turned the polls. Fortuyn blamed the problems in the country on the Purple cabinets (in which both Dijkstal and Melkert served as ministers). Fortuyn depicted Dijkstal and Melkert as two bureaucrats who didn't understand the feelings and problems among the population. After a heated campaign a mere days before the election, Fortuyn was assassinated in Hilversum. The VVD suffered a big loss, losing 14 seats and now had 24 seats in the House of Representatives. Dijkstal accepted responsibility for the defeat. On May 16, 2002, he announced his resignation as leader. He continued to serve in the House of Representatives as a backbencher until his resignation on 1 September 2002.

When his former party started taking a heavy stance on 'allochtonen' (immigrants and their children) he teamed up with former politicians from a wide range of other parties in protest, to strive for a more tolerant society, under the name "Een Land Een Samenleving" ('One Country One Society').

Post-politics
Dijkstal retired from national politics and became active in the private sector and public sector and occupied numerous seats as a corporate director and nonprofit director on several boards of directors and supervisory boards (Institute for Multiparty Democracy, International Institute of Social History, Naturalis Biodiversity Center, Public Pension Funds APB and the Anne Frank Foundation) and served on several state commissions and councils on behalf of the government (Council for Public Administration, Cadastre Agency and the Netherlands Film Fund) and as an advocate, lobbyist and activist for social justice and democracy.

Reputation
Dijkstal was known for his abilities as a consensus builder and manager.

Personal life 
On 29 July 1966 he married Anneke Dijkstal and became the father of two daughters.

He was a fan and admirer of Star Trek.

Death
Dijkstal continued to comment on political affairs until his death from bone cancer at the age of 67.

Decorations

References

External links

  H.F. (Hans) Dijkstal Parlement & Politiek

 
 

 

 
 

 

 

1943 births
2010 deaths
Aldermen of Wassenaar
Deaths from bone cancer
Deaths from cancer in the Netherlands
Deputy Prime Ministers of the Netherlands
Dutch agnostics
Dutch corporate directors
Dutch critics
Dutch democracy activists
Dutch financial advisors
Dutch lobbyists
Dutch management consultants
Dutch nonprofit directors
Dutch nonprofit executives
Dutch political activists
Dutch political commentators
Dutch saxophonists
Dutch social justice activists
Male saxophonists
Members of the House of Representatives (Netherlands)
Ministers of the Interior of the Netherlands
Municipal councillors of Wassenaar
Leaders of the People's Party for Freedom and Democracy
Officers of the Order of Orange-Nassau
People from Port Said
People from Wassenaar
People's Party for Freedom and Democracy politicians
Royal Netherlands Air Force officers
University of Amsterdam alumni
20th-century Dutch educators
20th-century Dutch military personnel
20th-century Dutch politicians
21st-century Dutch educators
21st-century Dutch politicians
20th-century saxophonists